is a private university in Nagakute, Aichi, Japan. The predecessor of the school was founded in 1905. It was chartered as a women's college in 1975 and became co-educational in 1995.

External links
 Official website 
 Official website

Educational institutions established in 1905
Private universities and colleges in Japan
Aichi Shukutoku University
1905 establishments in Japan
Nagakute, Aichi